Marlène Talih is a Lebanese beauty pageant titleholder who was crowned Miss Lebanon 1966. She competed for the Miss World 1966 title on 17 November 1966 at the Lyceum Ballroom in London.

References

Possibly living people
Lebanese beauty pageant winners
Miss World 1966 delegates